Ksenia Lykina and Anastasia Pavlyuchenkova were the defending champions, but chose not to participate that year.

Christina McHale and Ajla Tomljanović won the tournament, defeating Aleksandra Krunić and Sandra Zaniewska in the final, 6–1, 2–6, [10–4].

Seeds

Draw

Finals

Top half

Bottom half

External links 
 Draw

Girls D
Australian Open, 2009 Girls' Doubles